The 12629 / 12630 Karnataka Sampark Kranti Express is a Sampark Kranti Express train belonging to South Western Railway Zone that runs between  and  in India. It is currently being operated with 12629/12630 train numbers on a biweekly basis.

Service

The  12629/Karnataka Sampark Kranti Express has an average speed of 55 km/hr and covers 2614 km in 47h 15m. The 12630/Karnataka Sampark Kranti Express has an average speed of 57 km/hr and covers 2614 km in 45h 35m.

Coach composition

The train has standard LHB rakes with a max speed of 130 kmph. The train consists of 22 coaches:

 1 First AC
 1 AC II Tier
 4 AC III Tier
 10 Sleeper coaches
 1 Pantry car
 1 High Capacity Parcel Van
 2 General Unreserved
 2 Seating cum Luggage Rake

Traction

Both trains are hauled by a Krishnarajapuram-based WDP-4D diesel locomotive from Bengaluru to Pune. From Pune, train is hauled by a Tughlakabad-based WAP-7 electric locomotive to Hazrat Nizamuddin and vice versa.

Rake sharing

The train shares its rake with 12649/12650 Karnataka Sampark Kranti Express (via Ballari).

Speed

The train has standard LHB coach with a maximum speed of 130 km/hr. However, the maximum permissible speed of the train is 110 km/hr, which is observed between New Delhi and Lalitpur, and Manmad Junction and Bhusawal Junction. The average speed of the train with halts included is 57 km/hr.

See also 

 Yesvantpur Junction railway station
 Hazrat Nizamuddin railway station
 Karnataka Sampark Kranti Express (disambiguation)
 Yesvantpur–Chandigarh Karnataka Sampark Kranti Express

Notes

References

External links 

 12629/Karnataka Sampark Kranti Express India Rail Info
 12630/Karnataka Sampark Kranti Express India Rail Info

Transport in Bangalore
Transport in Delhi
Sampark Kranti Express trains
Rail transport in Karnataka
Rail transport in Uttar Pradesh
Rail transport in Madhya Pradesh
Rail transport in Haryana
Rail transport in Maharashtra
Rail transport in Delhi